The name Talim has been used for three tropical cyclones in the Western Pacific Ocean. The name was contributed by the Philippines and is a Filipino word meaning "a sharp or cutting edge" (of an object, e.g. knife).

 Typhoon Talim (2005) (T0513, 13W, Isang), a strong Category 4 super typhoon that made landfall in Taiwan and China.
 Tropical Storm Talim (2012) (T1205, 06W, Carina)
 Typhoon Talim (2017) (T1718, 20W, Lannie), a powerful Category 4 typhoon that through the Ryukyu Islands and made landfall on Kyushu.

Pacific typhoon set index articles